Charles Tyrwhitt Shirts Ltd., also known as CT Shirts, is a British multi-channel clothing retailer specialising in dress shirts, ties, suits, casualwear, shoes and accessories. 

Founded as a mail order company in 1986 by Nicholas Wheeler while he was a student at the University of Bristol, Wheeler stated he started the business because he thought he "could make a shirt better than anybody else". In 1997, the company opened its first store on Jermyn Street in London, notable for its history in British shirt making. 

Wheeler's wife, Chrissie Rucker, is the founder and owner of The White Company.

History

In 1986, Charles Tyrwhitt was founded as a mail order company by Wheeler while studying at Bristol University. The company began operating from a small space on Fulham Road, London, before expanding the business with retail and e-commerce stores. Beginning as a men's shirt maker, the offering has since expanded to include suits, shoes, knitwear, accessories and a collection of business casual wear.

List of CEOs 
Greg Hodder was the first CEO to be appointed; previously, the company was under the control of founder Nick Wheeler with no formal CEO position.

 Greg Hodder (2008–2017)
 David Boynton (2017–2018)
 Michael Stanier (2018–2019)
 Luke Kingsnorth (since April 2019)

Awards
Charles Tyrwhitt was awarded first place for customer service in the 2011 Sunday Times Profit Track 100 awards.

Charles Tyrwhitt earned awards at the Top 50 Companies For Customer Service Awards, including Best Web Chat, Best E-Retailer, second place for Calls and third for best overall customer service. Charles Tyrwhitt received the Queen's Award for Enterprise for International Trade in 2016.

References

External links

1986 establishments in the United Kingdom
Clothing brands of the United Kingdom
Retail companies based in London
Retail companies established in 1986